Karia Peak is the rounded ice-covered peak rising to 1637 m in the west foothills of Bruce Plateau on Loubet Coast in Graham Land, Antarctica.  It has steep and partly ice-free west and south slopes, and surmounts Erskine Glacier to the south and a tributary to that glacier to the west and north.

The peak is named after the ancient town of Karia in Northeastern Bulgaria.

Location
British mapping in 1976.

Maps
 Antarctic Digital Database (ADD). Scale 1:250000 topographic map of Antarctica. Scientific Committee on Antarctic Research (SCAR). Since 1993, regularly upgraded and updated.
British Antarctic Territory. Scale 1:200000 topographic map. DOS 610 Series, Sheet W 66 64. Directorate of Overseas Surveys, Tolworth, UK, 1976.

Notes

References
 Bulgarian Antarctic Gazetteer. Antarctic Place-names Commission. (details in Bulgarian, basic data in English)
 Karia Peak. SCAR Composite Antarctic Gazetteer.

External links
 Karia Peak. Copernix satellite image

Mountains of Graham Land
Bulgaria and the Antarctic
Loubet Coast